Naphtali Friedman (sometimes also spelled Naftali; 15 May 1863, Juodžiai, Kovno Governorate - 5 May 1921) was a Jewish Lithuanian lawyer and politician.

Elected as a Russian Constitutional Democratic Party deputy representing Kovno Governorate to the Third (1907-1912, out of 2 Jewish deputies) and Fourth (1912-1917, out of 3 Jewish deputies) State Duma of the Russian Empire. In 1914 he made a speech in which he claimed that the Jews would fight until the victory of the Russian Empire was achieved. He was also elected on April 19, 1920 to the Constituent Assembly of Lithuania on a common Jewish ticket and died in 1921.

References

1863 births
1921 deaths
People from Joniškis District Municipality
People from Rossiyensky Uyezd
Jewish Lithuanian politicians
Russian Constitutional Democratic Party members
Members of the 3rd State Duma of the Russian Empire
Members of the 4th State Duma of the Russian Empire
Russian Constituent Assembly members
Members of the Seimas